New Orleans is a city and a metropolitan area in the U.S. state of Louisiana.

New Orleans may also refer to:

Film
New Orleans (1929 film), an American drama film
New Orleans (1947 film), a musical

Music 
New Orleans (album), an album by PJ Morton
New Orleans, an album by Bo Kaspers Orkester
"New Orleans" (Gary U.S. Bonds song), a 1960 song by Gary U.S. Bonds
"New Orleans" (Hoagy Carmichael song) (1932)
"New Orleans", a 2011 song by Emmylou Harris from Hard Bargain
"New Orleans", a song by Rancid from Let the Dominoes Fall
"New Orleans", a 2007 song by Kid Rock from Rock n Roll Jesus
 Dixieland or New Orleans jazz, a style of jazz music
 New Orleans blues, a subgenre of blues music and a variation of Louisiana blues

Watercraft
New Orleans (steamboat)
CSS New Orleans, a floating gun battery on the Mississippi River in the service of the Confederate States of America
, various ships

Other uses
New Orleans (Rotterdam), a residential skyscraper in Rotterdam, Netherlands
New Orleans Records, an audio record producing company
University of New Orleans, a state university in New Orleans
New Orleans Privateers, part of the university's athletic program

See also 
 Battle of New Orleans (disambiguation)
 City of New Orleans (disambiguation)